Ruth McGinnis (1910 – May 16, 1974) was a Straight pool player from the United States, who is considered one of the greatest female pool players of all time.

Early life
McGinnis stated playing pool at the aged 7 in her father's barbershop pool hall on South Main Street in Honesdale, Pennsylvania. She was a prodigious player at a young age, making a run of 47 at the age of about 10. In 1922, aged 11, she played seven-year-old Willie Mosconi in a Philadelphia pool hall exhibition match, but the contest was stopped by police as local laws prohibited minors from being in pool halls. In 1924, McGinnis played exhibition matches against Ralph Greenleaf, and was described in The Tribune as Greneleaf's protégé.

She was the captain of the varsity basketball team that won the Pennsylvania state championship in 1928. McGinnis scored 36 points in one game, and 341 across the 15 games in the series.

Pool career
In 1934, she was assigned the title of Queen Billiard Player of the World by the World Billiards Association. In 1937, she challenged Babe Didrikson to a contest over ten sporting event. Didrikson refused that challenge, but played McGinnis at pool. McGinnis won 400-62 across four 100-up games.

In 1942, McGinnis became the first woman to compete in a men's tournament, the New York State Championship.

In 1943, she completed training as a physical education teacher at Teachers' College. Whilst at Stroudsburg, she participated in a number of sports, including soccer, golf, softball and field hockey. She also served as a lifeguard, and is said to have saved a man from drowning. McGinnis found it difficult to secure a teaching post after leaving Stroudsburg, and joined a programme called "Better Billiards," organised by the National Billiards Council of America, which sponsored McGinnis to visit pool halls and promote pool. The visits usually involved her giving a short talk, demonstrating some trick shots, and playing against representatives of the venue. She travelled around 28,000 miles a year, and over 200,000 miles in less than ten years.

In 1948, Mcginnis became the first woman to enter the World Straight Pool Championship.

She was acclaimed the title of women's world champion due to her being the best female player at a time were there were no tournaments for women. She played 1,532 exhibition matches through out her career and losing only 29 of them. MCginnis was considered by her peers and players as the best women's player in the country from the 1920s up until the 1960s.

Later life

In the mid-1950s, McGinnis graduated from East Stroudsbourg State Teachers College, and from 1960 was teaching physically challenged children at the S. A. Douglas School in Philadelphia.

She died of cancer aged 64 in 1974. McGinnis was posthumously inducted into the WPBA Hall of Fame in 1976, and into the Billiard Congress of America Hall of Fame in 1997.

A marker commemorating McGinnis has been erected in Honesdale, Pennsylvania in 2016 by the Pennsylvania Historical and Museum Commission.

References

External links
1946 Ruth McGinnis Billiards Champion YouTube video.
Ruth McGinnis: The Queen of Billiards Smithsonian Magazine article by Eliza McGraw, March 22, 2018.

1910 births
1974 deaths
American pool players
Female pool players
People from Honesdale, Pennsylvania